Ederson Tormena (born March 14, 1986 in Brusque) is a Brazilian footballer who plays as a defensive midfielder. He last played for Asteras Tripoli in Greece.

Career
He signed a 5-year contract in April 2003 for Juventude and on 11 July 2007 for Germinal Beerschot. In January 2009, he signed a four and half-year deal with KRC Genk, while Wim De Decker made the move to Germinal Beerschot. On 3 May 2010, he signed for R. Charleroi S.C. on loan and signed now a four-year-deal.

Personal life
His brother Gustavo Tormena played also with him at K.F.C. Germinal Beerschot.

Honours
Genk
Belgian Cup: 2008–09

References

External links 
 

1986 births
Living people
Brazilian footballers
Brazilian expatriate footballers
Sportspeople from Santa Catarina (state)
Sport Club Internacional players
Esporte Clube Juventude players
R. Charleroi S.C. players
K.R.C. Genk players
Beerschot A.C. players
Asteras Tripolis F.C. players
Belgian Pro League players
Challenger Pro League players
Super League Greece players
Expatriate footballers in Belgium
Expatriate footballers in Greece
People from Brusque, Santa Catarina
Regionalliga players

Association football defenders